Santiago Antonio Clariond Desdier (born as Jacques Antoine Clariond Desdier in France) was a Mexican businessman.

Clariond founded Industrias Monterrey (IMSA) in 1936. IMSA made steel and aluminium along with batteries. In 2007 IMSA sold its steel division to Ternium. He married Maria del Consuelo Garza Gonzalez and had 2 children and 10 grandchildren. He was the grandfather of two governors of Nuevo León: (son of Eugenio Clariond Garza) and (son of Consuelo Clariond Garza).

Wife: Maria Consuelo Garza Gonzalez; 
Children: Eugenio Clariond Garza (1919-2004), Maria Consuelo Clariond Garza (1922-2016); 
Grandchildren: Eugenio, Ninfa, Maria, Benjamin, Santiago, Jose. 
(Clariond Reyes-Retana from Eugenio Clariond Garza). (From Consuelo Consuelo Fernando, Susana and Marcelo Canales Clariond).

External links
History  of Grupo IMSA
La economía de la frontera México-Estados Unidos en el siglo XXI  ("The economy of the Mexico-United States border in the 21st century")

French businesspeople
Mexican businesspeople
Mexican company founders
French emigrants to Mexico
Living people
Year of birth missing (living people)